David Allen Lee (born November 8, 1943) is a former American football punter for the former Baltimore Colts in the National Football League.

On October 1, 2011, Lee was inducted into the Louisiana Tech University Athletic Hall of Fame.

References

External links
Klingaman, Mike. "Catching Up With...former Colt David Lee," The Toy Department (The Baltimore Sun sports blog), Thursday, November 19, 2009.

1943 births
Living people
American football punters
Baltimore Colts players
Louisiana Tech Bulldogs baseball players
Louisiana Tech Bulldogs football players
Minden High School (Minden, Louisiana) alumni
Sportspeople from Minden, Louisiana
Players of American football from Shreveport, Louisiana
Baseball players from Shreveport, Louisiana
Businesspeople from Louisiana